Eddleman is a surname. Notable people with the surname include:

Clyde D. Eddleman (1902–1992), United States Army general
Dwight Eddleman (1922–2001), American athlete

See also
Edelman